Jacob Mincer (July 15, 1922 – August 20, 2006), was a father of modern labor economics. He was Joseph L. Buttenwieser Professor of Economics and Social Relations at Columbia University for most of his active life.

Biography
Born in Tomaszów Lubelski, Poland, Mincer survived World War II prison camps in Czechoslovakia and Germany as a teenager.  After graduating from Emory University in 1950, Mincer received his PhD from Columbia University in 1957.

Following teaching stints at City College of New York, Hebrew University, Stockholm School of Economics and the University of Chicago, Mincer joined Columbia's faculty in 1959. He stayed at Columbia until his retirement in 1991.

Mincer was also a member of the National Bureau of Economic Research from 1960 through his death.

Mincer died at his Manhattan home on August 20, 2006, due to complications from Parkinson's disease, according to his wife, Dr. Flora Mincer, and his daughters, Deborah Mincer (Sussman) and Carolyn Mincer.

Contributions to economic science
Mincer was considered by many to be a father of modern labor economics. As a leading member of a group of economists known as the Chicago School of Economics, Mincer and Nobel Laureate Gary Becker helped to develop the empirical foundations of human capital theory, consequently revolutionizing the field of labor economics.

During his academic career, Mincer authored four books and hundreds of journal articles, papers and essays.  Mincer's ground-breaking work: Schooling, Experience and Earnings, published in 1974, used data from the 1950 and 1960 Censuses to relate income distribution in America to the varying amounts of education and on-the-job training among workers. "He calculated, for example, that annual earnings rose by 5 to 10 percent in the 1950s and 1960s for every year of additional schooling. There was a similar, although smaller, return on investment in job training—and age played a role."

Mincer's work continues to have a profound impact on the field of labor economics.  Papers in the field frequently use Mincerian equations, which model wages as a function of human capital in statistical estimation.  And as a result of Mincer's pioneering work, variables such as schooling and work experience are now the most commonly used measures of human capital.

Awards and prizes
In 1967 Mincer was elected as a Fellow of the American Statistical Association.

In 1991, he received an honorary doctorate from the University of Chicago which recognized his seminal work in the economic analysis of earnings and inequality, the labor force decisions of women and of job mobility. The citation for the degree also recognized Mincer's work in this area that has helped guide a generation of economists who study these important social questions.

In recognition of his lifetime achievements in economics, Mincer was awarded the first IZA Prize in Labor Economics of the Institute for the Study of Labor (Bonn, Germany). The $50,000 prize was presented to Mincer by more than 100 of his former students and colleagues at a conference at Columbia University in 2002.

In 2004 Mincer received a Career Achievement Award from the Society of Labor Economists; the annual award has subsequently become known as the Mincer Award.

Mincer was never awarded a Nobel Prize, though he was considered one of the world's greatest economists of the 20th century, and was nominated for the award numerous times by admiring colleagues.

Quotes regarding Mincer

Selected bibliography

Book chapters
 
Reprinted as: 
 

Journal articles

Notes

External links
 IZA (Institute for the Study of Labor) Prize in Labor Economics 
 University of Chicago's Society of Labor Economists Mincer Award 

1922 births
2006 deaths
Columbia University alumni
Members of the United States National Academy of Sciences
American people of Polish-Jewish descent
20th-century American economists
Labor economists
Columbia University faculty
Fellows of the Econometric Society
Fellows of the American Statistical Association
Distinguished Fellows of the American Economic Association
Polish emigrants to the United States